Vernalis is an unincorporated community in San Joaquin County, California, United States. It was named after two daughters of local ranchers: Verna Carpenter and Alice Hamilton. Vernalis has a post office with ZIP code 95385.

During World War 2 Vernalis was home to the Naval Auxiliary Air Station Vernalis, Vernalis Reconditioning Center and Vernalis Prisoner of War Branch Camp.

References

Unincorporated communities in California
Unincorporated communities in San Joaquin County, California